Kamel Rahmani (born 20 February 1979) is an Algerian boxer. He won a gold medal in the men's super heavyweight event at the 2011 All-Africa Games. After the continental championships, he didn't compete at the World Championships because he had a muscle injury.

Career

World Series of Boxing record

References

External links

1979 births
Living people
People from Algiers
Algerian male boxers
African Games medalists in boxing
African Games gold medalists for Algeria
Competitors at the 2011 All-Africa Games
Super-heavyweight boxers
21st-century Algerian people